Gary John Ballman (July 6, 1940 – May 20, 2004) was an American football wide receiver in the National Football League.  Ballman starred at Michigan State before playing halfback and wide receiver for the Pittsburgh Steelers from 1962 to 1966, making the Pro Bowl the final two seasons.  He is among the team’s career leaders in kickoffs (64 returns for 1,711 yards), with the second-best average of 26.7. His 93-yard return against Washington on November 17, 1963, is tied for seventh-longest in team history. He played for the Philadelphia Eagles from 1967 to 1972, then split his final season between the New York Giants and the Minnesota Vikings. Ballman later worked for the National Football League Players Association until 1979 and as a building products salesman in Colorado before retiring in 2003.

External links
Gary Ballman article

1940 births
2004 deaths
American football wide receivers
Pittsburgh Steelers players
Philadelphia Eagles players
Minnesota Vikings players
New York Giants players
Eastern Conference Pro Bowl players
Michigan State Spartans football players
Players of American football from Detroit